Ju Kwon (also known as Joo Kwan, born May 31, 1995) is a Chinese-Korean baseball pitcher who plays with the KT Wiz in the KBO League.

Ju became a South Korean citizen in 2007 and played youth baseball in South Korea.

On May 27, 2016, he recorded nine scoreless innings, four hits, and four strikeouts against Nexen, recording his first complete victory in his debut.

Ju represented China at the 2017 World Baseball Classic. He faced criticism from fans for his decision which he said hurt him deeply.

Ju announced prior to the 2023 World Baseball Classic that, while he would play for China, he would not pitch against South Korea if the two teams faced each other. He further said that he would have preferred to play for South Korea if he had been selected.

References

External links 

1995 births
2017 World Baseball Classic players
Baseball pitchers
Chinese emigrants to South Korea
KT Wiz players
Living people
Naturalized citizens of South Korea
South Korean baseball players
People who lost Chinese citizenship
2023 World Baseball Classic players